Juventus Football Club first participated in a Union of European Football Associations (UEFA) competition in 1958. The first international cup in which the club took part since the advent of professionalism in Italy was the Central European Cup, an inter-association tournament where the Old Lady made its debut in 1929. That competition lasted from 1927 to 1940 and the club reached the semi-finals in five editions. From 1938 to the Torneio Internacional de Clubes Campeões in 1951, in which they gained the final, Juventus did not participate in any international championships. After the establishing of UEFA in 1954 and the creation of its first own club competitions since the following year, they have competed, as of 2022, in six out of the seven confederation tournaments. After its triumph in 1985 Intercontinental Cup, the club obtained its first world champion title and contemporaneously claimed the title at least once in each of then five international competitions, making the Turinese club the first and only one worldwide in reach that achievement, which was revalidated after winning the UEFA Intertoto Cup fourteen years later and remained in force until the first Europa Conference League final played in 2022.

One of the most titled clubs in the sport, Juventus is Italy's second most successful team in European competitions, sixth at continental level and twelfth with the most official international trophies won in the world, having won eleven official tournaments: the UEFA Champions League (formerly known as the European Champions' Cup) twice, European Cup Winners' Cup once, the UEFA Europa League (formerly known as the UEFA Cup) thrice, the UEFA Intertoto Cup once, the UEFA Super Cup twice and the Intercontinental Cup twice; being a finalist on nine occasions (seven in European Champions' Cup and Champions League, one in UEFA Cup and one in Intercontinental Cup), occupying the fourth position in the all-time UEFA competitions ranking, and having obtained the highest coefficient score during seven seasons since its introduction in 1979, the most for an Italian team in both. Based to these results, Juventus was recognised as Italy's best club and second in Europe of the 20th century according to the perpetual classify published in 2009 by the International Federation of Football History and Statistics (IFFHS), an organisation recognised by FIFA.

Qualification for international competitions is determined by a team's success in its national league and cup competitions from the previous season. Juventus competed at that level for 28 consecutive seasons since 1963 to 1991 (20 consecutive seasons in UEFA competitions since 1971 to 1991), more than other Italian club, winning six titles and gaining the final 11 times during that period.

Giovanni Trapattoni is the club's most successful manager at international stage, with six trophies. During his first spell in the club between the 1970s and 1980s, Juventus became the first and only Italian side to win an international competition without foreigner footballers, the first club in the history of European football to have won all three seasonal tournaments organised by the Union of European Football Associations, being also the only one to reach it with the same coach spell, and the first European club to win the Intercontinental Cup, in 1985, since it was restructured by the European confederation and Confederación Sudamericana de Fútbol (CONMEBOL)'s organizing committee five years beforehand; being awarded with The UEFA Plaque by the confederation's president Jacques Georges on 12 July 1988 at Geneva, Switzerland.

Juventus' biggest-margin win in UEFA club competitions is a 7–0 victory over Lechia Gdańsk in the 1983–84 European Cup Winners' Cup, Valur in the 1986–87 European Champions' Cup and Olympiacos in the 2003–04 UEFA Champions League. Alessandro Del Piero holds the club record for the most appearances (130) and goals scored on that stage (54).

UEFA-organised seasonal competitions 

Juventus' score listed first.

European Cup / UEFA Champions League

European Cup Winners' Cup

UEFA Cup / UEFA Europa League

European Super Cup / UEFA Super Cup

UEFA Intertoto Cup

UEFA-CONMEBOL competitions

Intercontinental Cup

Non-UEFA organised seasonal competitions

Inter-Cities Fairs Cup

Non-UEFA organised summer competitions

Central European Cup/Mitropa Cup 

1 The match was abandoned with Juventus leading 2–0 after the crowd, enraged Slavia had conceded two quick goals in the match and resorted to obstruction and time wasting, threw stones onto the pitch. After a stone hit and seriously injured Slavia goalkeeper František Plánička, Slavia's team walked off; both teams' fans invaded the pitch in response, leaving Slavia pinned in their dressing rooms for hours while 1,500 soldiers and policemen formed a cordon. Slavia Prague and Juventus were both ejected from the competition.

Latin Cup

Overall record

By competition 
As of 16 March 2023.
UEFA competitions includes European Champions' Cup and Champions League, UEFA Cup Winners' Cup, UEFA Cup and Europa League, UEFA Intertoto Cup, UEFA Super Cup and Intercontinental Cup.

Source: UEFA.comPld = Matches played; W = Matches won; D = Matches drawn; L = Matches lost; GF = Goals for; GA = Goals against; GD = Goal Difference. 

 UEFA club competitions all-time ranking (since 1955): 4th place (Italian record)
 UEFA coefficient most top-ranked club by 5-year period (since 1975–1979): 7 times (Italian record)

By club 
As of 16 March 2023

By country
As of 9 March 2023.

Key

See also 
 Italian football clubs in international competitions
 List of UEFA club competition winners
 List of world champion football clubs
 UEFA club competition records and statistics

References 

   

Europe
Italian football clubs in international competitions